Zwei (German: "two") may refer to:
 Zwei (band), a Japanese duo band
 ZWEI, a text editor
 Zwei: The Arges Adventure, 2001 video game
 Zwei: The Ilvard Insurrection, 2008 video game
 Zwei, a team in Infinite Ryvius anime series
 Zwei, a  character in Phantom of Inferno anime series
 Zwei, a Pembroke Welsh Corgi in the anime series RWBY.
 Project Zwai, the codename for the video game The Evil Within